Georg Balthazar von Neumayer (21 June 1826 – 24 May 1909), was a German polar explorer and scientist who was a proponent of the idea of international cooperation for meteorology and scientific observation.

Biography

Early years 
Born in Kirchheimbolanden, Palatinate, Neumayer finished his education in  geophysics and hydrography in Munich, Bavaria in 1849; and becoming much interested in polar exploration, continued his studies in terrestrial magnetism, oceanography, navigation, and nautical astronomy. To obtain practical experience he made a voyage to South America, and after his return gave a series of lectures at Hamburg on Maury's theories of the ocean, and recent improvements in navigation. He then decided to go to Australia, shipped as a sailor before the mast, and arrived at Sydney in 1852.

Australia
von Neumayer was one of a number of influential German-speaking residents  such as William Blandowski, Ludwig Becker, Hermann Beckler, Amalie Dietrich, Diedrich Henne, Gerard Krefft, Johann Luehmann, Johann Menge, Ludwig Preiss, Carl Ludwig Christian Rümker (a.k.a. Ruemker), Moritz Richard Schomburgk, Richard Wolfgang Semon, George Ulrich, Eugene von Guérard, Robert von Lendenfeld, Ferdinand von Mueller, and Carl Wilhelmi  who brought their "epistemic traditions" to Australia, and not only became "deeply entangled with the Australian colonial project", but also "intricately involved in imagining, knowing and shaping colonial Australia" (Barrett, et al., 2018, p.2).
After trying his fortune on the goldfields, Neumayer gave lectures on navigation to seamen, and spent some time in Tasmania at the observatory in Hobart. He returned to Germany in 1854 convinced that Australia offered a great field for scientific exploration, obtained the support of the King of Bavaria and encouragement from leading British scientists. He sailed again for Australia and arrived in Melbourne in January 1857. He asked the government of Victoria to provide him with a site for an observatory, about £700 for a building, and about £600 a year for expenses. He had brought with him a collection of magnetical, nautical and meteorological instruments valued at £2000, which had been provided by the King of Bavaria.

Neumayer suggested as a suitable site a block of land not far from the present position of the observatory, but this was not granted. He was, however, allowed the use of the buildings of the signal station on Flagstaff Hill creating the Flagstaff Observatory for Geophysics, Magnetism and Nautical Science at what is now Flagstaff Gardens in Melbourne, Australia. From 1 March 1858 he carried on the systematic registration of meteorological and nautical data. A few weeks later he added regular observations on atmospheric electricity and changes in the magnetic elements.

Between 1858 and 1863, he, and a team of assistants, extracted data from hundreds of ship logbooks that was then analysed to find the best route of maximum speed and safety for sailing ships travelling between Europe and Australia. To obtain the logbooks he placed advertisements in the Victorian Government Gazette, and posted signs at the Melbourne Customs House, requesting the masters of arriving vessels to deposit their logbooks at his offices in the Flagstaff Observatory with a promise they would be returned within four days. More than 600 logs were examined and the information extracted was analysed and the conclusions published in the second half of a book published in 1864.

Neumayer was elected a councillor of the Royal Society of Victoria in 1859, a vice-president in 1860 and a life member in 1864.

Burke and Wills Expedition 

William John Wills, second-in-command of the Burke and Wills expedition succeeded J. W. Osborne as Neumayer's assistant at the Flagstaff Observatory until the expedition departed from Melbourne on 20 August 1860. Neumayer was a member of the Exploration Committee of the Royal Society of Victoria which organised the Expedition. Neumayer joined the Expedition at Swan Hill in order to conduct his magnetic observations. He remained with Burke and Wills as far as the Darling River at Bilbarka, before returning to the settled districts of Victoria.

Legacy 

He published in 1860, Results of the Magnetical, Nautical and Meteorological Observations from March 1858 to February 1859, and did a large amount of travelling in Victoria in connection with his magnetic survey of the colony. He published his Results of the Meteorological Observations 1859-1862 and Nautical Observations 1858-1862 in 1864, and in the same year returned to Germany. In 1867 he brought out his Discussion of the Meteorological and Magnetical Observations made at the Flagstaff Observatory, and in 1869 appeared his extremely valuable Results of the Magnetic Survey of the Colony of Victoria—1858-1864.

Later, he organized the "Gazelle Expedition." (1874-1876) and was director of the hydrographic organisation "Deutsche Seewarte" (1876-1903). He chaired the International Polar Commission in 1879 together with  Karl Weyprecht, founding the first International Polar Year 1882/83 and the Antarctic Year 1901. In 1895, von Neumayer had established the German Commission for South Polar Exploration, which culminated in the First German Antarctica Expedition in 1901, the so-called Gauss expedition.

In 1890 he co-authored the first cloud atlas.

Polar explorer Roald Amundsen came to study under Neumayer in 1900. In the same year, Neumayer was designated a Commander of the Order of Merit of the Bavarian Crown, including the right to furthermore have his surname preceded by 'Ritter von' ('Knight of').

Neumayer died in 1909 in Neustadt an der Weinstraße. He gave his name to the German Polar Research Station in Antarctica, the now abandoned "Neumayer Station". This year-round manned station is totally covered with ice and snow (buried 10 meters under the surface) and is situated in the Weddell-Sea area (08 15W, 70 35S). The successor was the Neumayer Station II which was then abandoned itself. The only station in use now is the Neumayer Station III. Research topics are permanent observations of the Earth's magnetic field, seismological registrations, infrasonic, meteorological and air chemistry investigations.

Bibliography 
 Georg Neumayer, "Die internationale Polarforschung" (Berlin 1886 / 2 volumes).
 Georg Neumayer, "Auf zum Südpol" (Berlin 1901).
 Georg Neumayer, "Description and system of working of the Flagstaff Observatory". In J. Macadam (Ed.), Transactions of the Philosophical Institute of Victoria: From January to December 1858 inclusive. Vol. III. (Melbourne 1859).
 Georg Neumayer, "Results of the Magnetic Survey of the Colony of Victoria. Executed during the years 1858-1864" (Mannheim 1869).
 Edward Heis and George Neumayer, "On Meteors in the Southern Hemisphere" (Mannheim 1867).

Notes

References
 Barrett, L., Eckstein, L., Hurley, A.W. & Schwarz A. (2018), "Remembering German-Australian Colonial Entanglement: An Introduction", Postcolonial Studies, Vol.21, No.1, (January 2018), pp.1-5. 
 R.W. Home, "Neumayer, Humboldt and the search for a global physics", Proceedings of the Royal Society of Victoria, 123 (1) 2011, pp. 2–10.
 Douglas Morrison, "Georg Neumayer's magnetic survey of the colony of Victoria 1858-1864," Proceedings of the Royal Society of Victoria, 123 (1) 2011, pp. 48–61.

External links
 Hidden in ice and snow - the Neumayer Station in the Antarctic
 The Royal Society of Victoria.
 Burke & Wills Web A comprehensive website containing many of the historical documents relating to the Burke & Wills Expedition.
 The Burke & Wills Historical Society The Burke & Wills Historical Society.

Hydrographers
German geophysicists
1826 births
1909 deaths
Recipients of the Cullum Geographical Medal
People from Kirchheimbolanden
Foreign Members of the Royal Society
People from the Palatinate (region)
History of Victoria (Australia)
19th-century Australian public servants
19th-century Australian scientists
Australian oceanographers